Passport-free zones may refer to:

Common Travel Area
Schengen Area (incl. Nordic Passport Union)
Central America-4 Border Control Agreement

Expedited border crossing schemes
Economic integration